The Women's Individual Class 8 table tennis competition at the 2008 Summer Paralympics was held between 7 September and 11 September at the Peking University Gymnasium.

Classes 6–10 were for athletes with a physical impairment who competed from a standing position; the lower the number, the greater the impact the impairment had on an athlete's ability to compete.

The event was won by Thu Kamkasomphou, representing .

Results

Preliminary round

Group A

Group B

Competition bracket

References

W
Para